The following is a list of health and wellness podcasts.

List

References

External links 
  at Podchaser
  at Player.fm
  at Player.fm
  on TuneIn
  on NPR

Lists of podcasts
Health and wellness podcasts
podcasts